Kent Williams is an American voice actor who works on English dubs of anime at Funimation/OkraTron 5000. He is known as the voice of Mercenary Tao, Dr. Gero, and Supreme Kai from the Dragon Ball franchise, Father in Fullmetal Alchemist: Brotherhood, the Judge from the Ace Attorney anime series, and Dr. Hatori Soma from the original Fruits Basket series, as well as its 2019 reboot.

Personal life 
Kent has a son, Adam, who voiced for Funimation under an alias as a child actor.

Filmography

Anime series

Animation
Death Battle – Bruce Wayne
Red vs. Blue – Surge
RWBY – Ghira Belladonna

Film/special

Video games

References

External links

Kent Williams at the English Voice Actor & Production Staff Database

Place of birth missing (living people)
American male voice actors
American voice directors
Living people
Year of birth missing (living people)